Cardinal Giovanni Dolfin, often Italianized as Delfin or Delfino (Venice, 15 December 1545 - Venice, 25 November 1622), was an Italian politician and cardinal. He was one of several cardinals from his family by this name. He is the uncle of Cardinal Giovanni Delfino (iuniore).

Graduated in utroque jure at the University of Padua, he seemed to want to embrace the ecclesiastical state, but was instead initiated into a political and diplomatic career; after having exercised some minor offices in Venice, in 1577 he was appointed podestà and captain of Belluno.

Between 1582 and 1595 he was sent as ambassador of the Republic of Venice to Poland, Spain, Germany and France, whence he returned eight years later to go to the role of ambassador to the Holy See, a post he held until 1598. In the same year he officially represented Venice at the wedding of Philip III of Spain and in 1601 to those of Henry IV of France and Maria de' Medici.

Returning to his homeland he took the post of San Marco's attorney and the reformer of Studio Padovano.

In 1603, the Bishop of Vicenza remained vacant, Pope Clement VIII decided to assign him to Dolfin, to whom he was bound by ties of sympathy and mutual respect, although he was not a priest and the Venetian law did not allow ecclesiastical offices to be held by those who they had resided at the court of Rome. On 27 Dec 1603, he was consecrated bishop by Alfonso Visconti, Bishop of Spoleto, with Tommaso Contarini, Archbishop of Candia, and Leonardo Mocenigo, Bishop of Ceneda, serving as co-consecrators.

Episcopal succession
While bishop, he was the principal consecrator of:

See also
Bust of Cardinal Giovanni Dolfin

References

1545 births
1622 deaths
Republic of Venice clergy
17th-century Italian cardinals
Ambassadors of the Republic of Venice